Oliver Henry Wynne-Griffith (born 29 May 1994) is a British rower.

Rowing career
Wynne-Griffith won a bronze medal at the 2018 World Rowing Championships in Plovdiv, Bulgaria, as part of the eight with James Rudkin, Alan Sinclair, Tom Ransley, Thomas George, Moe Sbihi, Matthew Tarrant, Will Satch and Henry Fieldman. The following year he won another bronze medal at the 2019 World Rowing Championships in Ottensheim, Austria as part of the eight with George, Rudkin, Josh Bugajski, Sbihi, Jacob Dawson, Tarrant Thomas Ford and Fieldman.

He won a silver medal in the eight at the 2019 European Rowing Championships. In 2021, he won a European gold medal in the eight in Varese, Italy.

References

External links

Oliver Wynne-Griffith at British Rowing

Living people
1994 births
British male rowers
World Rowing Championships medalists for Great Britain
Rowers at the 2020 Summer Olympics
Medalists at the 2020 Summer Olympics
Olympic medalists in rowing
Olympic bronze medallists for Great Britain
21st-century British people